Hidāyat al-Qurān is a classical Sunni tafsir, composed first by Muhammad Usman Kashif Hashmi and then completed after his passing by Saeed Ahmad Palanpuri in 2016. Kashif Hashmi started this Urdu commentary and completed the Tafsir of Juz' 1–9 and 30. Due to some reasons, he could not complete it. Palanpuri completed this and also began to cover the parts authored by Hashmi. This was fully completed. The beauty of this tafsir is that it focuses on conveying the meaning of the text and the actual message of the Quran without branching off into related discussions. It was published in 8 volumes from Maktabatul Hijaz. Some students of Palanpuri translated the book into Bengali, which was published in 2021 from Maktabatul Medina.

See also

 List of tafsir works
 List of Sunni books

References

External links
Full Urdu Version

Urdu-language books
Deobandi literature
Sunni tafsir
Books by Saeed Ahmad Palanpuri